Novosibirsk Reservoir or Novosibirskoye Reservoir, informally called the Ob Sea, is the largest artificial lake in Novosibirsk Oblast and Altai Krai, Russian Federation. It was created by a 33 m high concrete dam on the Ob River built in Novosibirsk. The dam, built in 1956, provides a water reservoir for generating hydroelectric power via Novosibirsk Hydroelectric Station. The reservoir is 200 km long and up to 17 km wide. Its area is 1,070 km2 and its volume is 8.8 km3 (at normal water level). Its average depth is 8.3 m. The design hydroelectric power output is 460 MW, the average energy production is 1,687 GWh per year. The normal water level (the level of active storage) is 113,5 meters, the maximum water level (the level of flood control storage) is 115,7 meters, the minimum water level (the level of dead storage) is 108,5 meters 

The Karakan Pine Forest is situated on the eastern coast of the reservoir, while most of the towns and villages are situated on the western coast. The larger towns bordering the reservoir are Novosibirsk (Akademgorodok quarter, ObGES), Kamen-na-Obi and Berdsk. Berdsk was severely impacted by the reservoir's construction, its historical centre having been submerged by the water. Several smaller villages nearby met with the same fate.

Recreation
During the summer, the lake is one of the most popular destinations for Novosibirsk residents, with many yachts and boats dotting the surface, and the beaches teeming with people.

References

External links
Listing on WaytoRussia.net
Photographs 
Ob Sea
Ob sea, 5 km into the open

Reservoirs in Russia
Reservoirs in Novosibirsk Oblast
Reservoirs in Altai Krai
RNovosibirsk